Preluca may refer to several villages in Romania:

 Preluca, a village in Horea Commune, Alba County
 Preluca, a village in Scărișoara Commune, Alba County
 Preluca, a village in Gălăuțaș Commune, Harghita County
 Preluca, a village in Pângărați Commune, Neamț County
 Preluca Nouă and Preluca Veche, villages in Copalnic-Mănăștur Commune, Maramureș County